David Cronin may refer to:

 David Cronin, pilot of United Airlines Flight 811
 David Edward Cronin (1839–1925), American painter, illustrator and journalist